Brunneocorticium is a genus of fungi which following DNA analysis has been placed in the family Marasmiaceae.  The genus, described in 2007, contains two corticioid species and one species (B. corynecarpon) which does not seem to have any fruiting body.

Whilst B. bisporum is a crust fungus, B. corynecarpon is known only from its sterile flat mycelial threads (rhizomorphs) which spread in the rain-forest canopy with their knobby side-shoots.  They trap leaf-litter and harm the shrubs and trees on which they grow, as well as sometimes being used by birds as nesting material.  B. corynecarpon has been observed in Suriname, Belize, Guyana, Peru and Brazil.

References

External links

Agaricales enigmatic taxa
Agaricales genera
Marasmiaceae